The 1942 Pittsburgh Steelers season was the franchise's 10th season in the National Football League (NFL).  The team improved on their previous season result of 1–9–1 with a record of 7–4–0, which was good enough for 2nd place in the NFL East. This was the franchise's first ever winning record.

For the second straight year, the team held training camp in Hershey, Pennsylvania.

Regular season

Schedule

The 1942 Steeler Team was the best team the club had up to that point. For the first time in 10 seasons, the Steelers had a 4-game winning streak. The team finished with a 7-4 record and looked forward to the next season. However, due to the loss of players in the US draft, the team was forced to combine operation with the cross-state rival, Philadelphia Eagles. This would be one of the first times the Steelers felt that fate interrupted the future success that was expected. The Steelers wouldn't post another winning season until 1947, even then, their future was interrupted by fate.

Game Summaries

Week 1 (Sunday September 13, 1942): Philadelphia Eagles 

at Forbes Field, Pittsburgh, Pennsylvania

 Game time: 
 Game weather: 
 Game attendance: 13,349
 Referee:

Scoring Drives:

 Pittsburgh – Dudley 44 run (Binotto kick)
 Philadelphia – Davis 3 run (Barnum kick)
 Philadelphia – Supulski 41 pass from Thompson (Graves kick)
 Philadelphia – FG Barnum 24
 Philadelphia  Meyer 12 pass from Thompson (Barnum kick)
 Pittsburgh – Looney 24 pass from Dudley

Week 2 (Sunday, September 20, 1942): Washington Redskins  

at Griffith Stadium, Washington, DC

 Game time: 
 Game weather: 
 Game attendance: 25,000
 Referee:

Scoring Drives:

 Washington – Juzwik 2 run (Juzwik kick)
 Pittsburgh – Dudley 84 kick return (Sanders kick)
 Pittsburgh – Riffle 1 run (Sanders kick)
 Washington – Aldrich 50 blocked field goal return (Juzwik kick)
 Washington – Juzwik 39 run (Juzwik kick)
 Washington – Justice 3 pass from Baugh

Week 4 (Sunday October 4, 1942): New York Giants  

at Forbes Field, Pittsburgh, Pennsylvania

 Game time: 
 Game weather: 
 Game attendance: 9,600
 Referee:

Scoring Drives:

 New York – FG Cuff 37
 New York – Hapes 15 pass from Leemans (Cuff kick)
 Pittsburgh – Hoague 3 run (kick failed)
 Pittsburgh – Sandig 4 run (Niccolai kick)

Week 5 (Sunday October 11, 1942): Brooklyn Dodgers  

at Ebbets Field, Brooklyn, New York

 Game time: 
 Game weather: 
 Game attendance: 17,689
 Referee:

Scoring Drives:

 Pittsburgh – Dudley 7 run (Niccolai kick)

Week 6 (Sunday October 18, 1942): Philadelphia Eagles  

at Shibe Park, Philadelphia, Pennsylvania

 Game time: 
 Game weather: 
 Game attendance: 12,500
 Referee:

Scoring Drives:

 Pittsburgh  – Sandig 39 run (Niccolai kick)
 Pittsburgh – Riffle 1 run (Niccolai kick)

Week 7 (Sunday October 25, 1942): Washington Redskins  

at Forbes Field, Pittsburgh, Pennsylvania

 Game time: 
 Game weather: 
 Game attendance: 37,746
 Referee:

Scoring Drives:

 Washington – Todd 3 pass from Baugh (Masterson kick)
 Washington – Cifers 9 blocked punt return (Masterson kick)

Week 8 (Sunday November 1, 1942): New York Giants  

at Polo Grounds, New York, New York

 Game time: 
 Game weather: 
 Game attendance: 19,346
 Referee:

Scoring Drives:

 New York Giants – FG Cuff 18
 Pittsburgh – Sandig 64 punt return (Niccolai kick)
 Pittsburgh – FG Simington 16
 New York Giants – Cuff 35 pass from Cantor (Cuff kick)
 Pittsburgh – Dudley 66 run (Niccolai kick)

Week 9 (Sunday November 8, 1942): Detroit Lions  

at Briggs Stadium, Detroit, Michigan

 Game time: 
 Game weather: 
 Game attendance: 16,473
 Referee:

Scoring Drives:

 Detroit – Hackney run (Lio kick)
 Pittsburgh – Sandig 8 run (Niccolai kick)
 Pittsburgh – Brown 9 lateral from Kichefski after 15 pass from Dudley (Sanders kick)
 Pittsburgh – Dudley 37 run (Sanders kick)
 Pittsburgh – Riffle 1 run (Sanders kick)
 Pittsburgh – Lamas 29 fumble run (Sommers kick)

Week 10 (Sunday November 22, 1942): Chicago Cardinals  

at Forbes Field, Pittsburgh, Pennsylvania

 Game time: 
 Game weather: 
 Game attendance: 20,711
 Referee:

Scoring Drives:

 Chicago Cardinals – FG Daddio 38
 Pittsburgh – Riffle 44 run (Sanders kick)
 Pittsburgh – FG Niccolai 22
 Pittsburgh – FG Nicolai 30
 Pittsburgh – Gonda 27 run (kick failed)

Week 11 (Sunday November 29, 1942): Brooklyn Dodgers  

at Forbes Field, Pittsburgh, Pennsylvania

 Game time: 
 Game weather: 
 Game attendance: 4,593
 Referee:

Scoring Drives:

 Pittsburgh – Tomasic 52 punt return (Niccolai kick)
 Pittsburgh – Gonda 68 run (kick failed)

Week 12 (Sunday December 6, 1942): Green Bay Packers  

at Wisconsin State Fair Park, Milwaukee, Wisconsin

 Game time: 
 Game weather: 
 Game attendance: 5,138
 Referee:

Scoring Drives:

 Green Bay – Brock 20 pass from Isbell (Hutson kick)
 Green Bay – FG Hutson 20
 Pittsburgh – Martin 53 lateral from Riffle after run (Niccolai kick)
 Green Bay – Jacunski 49 pass from Isbell (Hutson kick)
 Green Bay – Rucinski 24 pass from Isbell (Hutson kick)
 Pittsburgh – Dudley 3 run (Simington kick)
 Pittsburgh – Martin 24 pass from Dudley (Sanders kick)

Standings

References

Pittsburgh Steelers seasons
Pittsburgh Steelers
Pittsburg Pir